Norwegian County Road 401 is a Norwegian county road in Vest-Agder and Aust-Agder counties in Norway.

References

401
Transport in Kristiansand